Jeffrey John Taljard (born 22 April 1987) is a South African rugby union player, currently playing with Romanian SuperLiga side CSM Olimpia București. His regular position is centre.

Career

He immediately became a regular for them over the next three seasons.

He joined Romanian SuperLiga side CSM Olimpia București in 2014.

Personal
He's the younger brother of rugby player Matthew Taljard.

References

1987 births
Living people
Border Bulldogs players
CSM București (rugby union) players
Rugby union players from East London, Eastern Cape
South African rugby union players
SWD Eagles players
Rugby union centres